Karine Vanasse (born 24 November 1983) is a French-Canadian actress, who had roles in the films Polytechnique, Séraphin: Heart of Stone (Séraphin: un homme et son péché), Switch and Set Me Free (Emporte-moi). Internationally she is best known for her roles as Colette Valois in Pan Am, Margaux LeMarchal in Revenge and Lise Delorme in Cardinal.

Life and career
Vanasse was born in Drummondville, Quebec, the daughter of Conrad Vanasse, a council worker, and Renée (née Gamache), who was her manager at the beginning of her career. At the age of nine, Vanasse expressed her desire to sing or to act and she fulfilled that wish when she appeared in the teen show Club des 100 watts after winning a "lip sync" competition. It was then, with the help of her mother, that Vanasse began to audition for, and take part in, TV commercials and to play minor and supporting roles in various French Canadian TV movies.

In 1998, the production company now known as Motion International asked Vanasse to co-host a Québec-based children's science show, Les Débrouillards. Producer Lorraine Richard and director Léa Pool spotted her there, and offered Vanasse her first big break in the role of Hanna in Set Me Free (Emporte-moi) (1999), a story of a teenager trying to find her identity in a tormented family environment. The film was presented at forty festivals, and shown in twenty countries. Her performance was highly acclaimed both nationally and internationally and earned her the 2000 Best Actress Jutra Award. 

Vanasse then played Lucie (the teenage love interest of Benoit Langlais's main character, Zac) in the controversial Québec TV series Deux frères (fr) (1999). Her character became very prominent in 2000–2001, and the debate stirred by the violent realism led her to become, together with Langlais, a spokesperson for the government-funded TV program Parler, c'est grandir, a broadcast aimed at youngsters from unstable backgrounds. In 2001, she applied for the ITHAKA program and took a six-month break in Greece to devote herself to travel and academics, after which she played Donalda in Charles Binamé's epic, Séraphin: Heart of Stone (Séraphin: un homme et son péché) (2002). She was cast as an FLQ terrorist in the 2006 miniseries October 1970 on CBC's English network. Vanasse appeared in such Canadian productions as Sans Elle, Ma fille, mon ange, and the Canadian/American/British mini-series Killer Wave.

In 2009, Vanasse was a producer and a cast member of the film Polytechnique, directed by Denis Villeneuve, which portrays the 1989 École Polytechnique massacre in Montréal. She won the Genie Award for Best Actress for her performance.

In 2011, Vanasse was cast as the French stewardess, Colette Valois, in the American-produced television series Pan Am, which was later cancelled after one season.

From January to April 2013, Vanasse was cast on the Quebec television series 30 Vies. In July 2013, Deadline Hollywood announced that Vanasse had joined the cast of ABC's Revenge as French businesswoman Margaux LeMarchal in the third season of the popular drama. During 2012 and 2013, Vanasse filmed the movies All the Wrong Reasons, Buddha's Little Finger and En solitaire.

From 2017 to 2020, Vanasse starred in the television series Cardinal, as detective Lise Delorme. It was the first time she had played a Québécoise character on English-language TV, rather than a character from France. At the 7th Canadian Screen Awards she won the award for Best Lead Actress in a Drama Program or Limited Series.

Personal life
She was in a relationship with Remstar CEO Maxime Rémillard from 2006 to 2014.

On 21 April 2018, Vanasse announced via Instagram that she had given birth to her first child, a boy, with her ex-boyfriend Hugues Harvey.

Filmography

Film

Television

References

External links
 
 

1983 births
20th-century Canadian actresses
21st-century Canadian actresses
Actresses from Quebec
Best Actress Genie and Canadian Screen Award winners
Canadian child actresses
Canadian film actresses
Canadian television actresses
Canadian voice actresses
French Quebecers
Living people
People from Drummondville
Best Actress in a Drama Series Canadian Screen Award winners
Best Actress Jutra and Iris Award winners